András Visontai (born 20 May 1979) is a Hungarian former ice dancer. With Zita Gebora, he is the 2000 Golden Spin of Zagreb champion and a three-time Hungarian national champion. They competed in the final segment at nine ISU Championships – three World Championships (2000–2002), three European Championships (2000–2002), and three World Junior Championships (1997–1999).

Gebora/Visontai won two silver medals during the 1997–98 ISU Junior Series and qualified to the final, where they placed fourth. After moving up to the senior level, they appeared at two Grand Prix events. They trained under Ilona Berecz in Budapest.

Programs 
(with Gebora)

Competitive highlights 
GP: Grand Prix; JGP: Junior Series / Junior Grand Prix

With Gebora

With Tarjani

References 

1979 births
Hungarian male ice dancers
Living people
Figure skaters from Budapest